Stanley M. Hough (born February 20, 1948, in Palatine, Illinois is an American Thoroughbred horse racing trainer. The son of Chicago-based Thoroughbred owner/trainer Joseph Hough, he embarked on a training career of his own in 1969.

For the five years from 1976 through 1980, Stanley Hough was the leading trainer at Calder Race Course in Miami Gardens, Florida. During that stretch, he won a track record five races on a single card on May 12, 1977, and went on to win a record 110 races for the full year. Among his top successes, in 1982 Stanley Hough won the prestigious Japan Cup when his Half Iced defeated such greats as April Run and U.S. Hall of Fame inductees John Henry and All Along.

Stanley Hough was inducted in the Calder Race Course Hall of Fame in 1996.

References

1948 births
Living people
American horse trainers
People from Palatine, Illinois